Anthony Browne Johnston Clogstoun (1815 - 15 January 1851) was acting lieutenant governor of the Gambia from 1837 to September 1838. He was appointed Marshal of the Island of Trinidad, the place of his birth, in 1840 and held the position until his death.

References

External links 
https://clugstonfamilytree.wordpress.com/home/kirkcudbright/

1815 births
1851 deaths
British colonial governors and administrators in Africa
British colonial governors and administrators in the Americas
19th-century Trinidad and Tobago people
Government of the Gambia